There are at least two figures named Mydon (Ancient Greek: Μύδων, gen.: Μύδωνος) in Greek mythology:
 Mydon, one of the defenders of Troy in Homer's Iliad.  In Book V, he is mentioned as being killed by Antilochus.
 Mydon, a Paeonian warrior defending Troy. He was killed by Achilles.

Notes

References 

 Homer, The Iliad with an English Translation by A.T. Murray, Ph.D. in two volumes. Cambridge, MA., Harvard University Press; London, William Heinemann, Ltd. 1924. . Online version at the Perseus Digital Library.
 Homer, Homeri Opera in five volumes. Oxford, Oxford University Press. 1920. . Greek text available at the Perseus Digital Library.

Trojans